4th Battalion, 14th Marines (4/14) was a United States reserve artillery battalion comprising three firing batteries and a headquarters battery.   The battalion was based in Bessemer, Alabama and its primary weapon system was the M198 Howitzer with a maximum effective range of 30 kilometers.  They were part of the 14th Marine Regiment and the 4th Marine Division.

Mission
Provide artillery support to a maneuver element or reinforcing fires to another artillery organization.

Subordinate units

History

4th Battalion, 14th Marines started as a direct support artillery Battalion utilizing the M109A3 (SP) Self Propelled Howitzer, then transferred all (18) M109A3 SP's to the Army and converted to the M198 Tow Howitzer.  4th Battalion, 14th Marines, 4th Marine Division was the last Marine Corps unit to use the M109A3 SP Howitzers.

Headquarters battery and Lima battery, both based in Bessemer, AL, were recently disbanded. Concurrent with this was the formation of the 4th Anti-Terrorism Battalion, an infantry unit, headquartered in Bessemer.
Kilo Battery was reassigned as a Himaars Battery and reassigned to 2nd Battalion 14th Marines.  Mike Battery was reassigned to 3rd Battalion 14th Marines, and has since transitioned to the M-198's replacement, the M-777 lightweight 155mm howitzer.  Mike Battery was activated again in 2007 for a 2008 deployment to Iraq.

See also

List of United States Marine Corps battalions
Organization of the United States Marine Corps

Notes

References

Web

 

d
Military units and formations in Alabama
Bessemer, Alabama